Nicolas Gruson (born 26 September 1974) is a French former swimmer who competed in the 1996 Summer Olympics.

References

1974 births
Living people
French male freestyle swimmers
Olympic swimmers of France
Swimmers at the 1996 Summer Olympics
20th-century French women